Wildwood is a historic house at 808 Park Avenue in Hot Springs, Arkansas.  It is a somewhat rambling -story wood-frame structure, with a variety of projecting sections, gables, and porches typical of the late Victorian Queen Anne period.  Notable features include a round corner turret, steeply pitched roofs, and a variety of exterior sheathing.  The interior is as ornate and elaborate as the exterior, with well-preserved woodwork from different types of hardwood in each downstairs room.  The house was designed by Phillip Van Patten and built in 1884 for his brother-in-law, Dr. Harvey Prosper Ellsworth.  The house is now a bed and breakfast inn.

The house was listed on the National Register of Historic Places in 1976.

See also
National Register of Historic Places listings in Garland County, Arkansas

References

External links

1884 Wildwood Inn web site

Houses on the National Register of Historic Places in Arkansas
Queen Anne architecture in Arkansas
Shingle Style architecture in Arkansas
Houses completed in 1884
Houses in Hot Springs, Arkansas
National Register of Historic Places in Hot Springs, Arkansas